The 2020 United States House of Representatives elections were held November 3, 2020, to elect representatives from all 435 congressional districts across each of the 50 U.S. states. The six non-voting delegates from the District of Columbia and the inhabited U.S. territories will also be elected. Numerous federal, state, and local elections, including the 2020 presidential election and the 2020 Senate elections, will also be held on this date.

Election ratings

Latest published ratings for competitive seats 
Several sites and individuals publish ratings of competitive seats. The seats listed below were considered competitive (not "safe" or "solid") by at least one of the rating groups. These ratings are based upon factors such as the strength of the incumbent (if the incumbent is running for re-election), the strength of the candidates, and the partisan history of the district (the Cook Partisan Voting Index is one example of this metric). Each rating describes the likelihood of a given outcome in the election.

Most election ratings use:
 Tossup: no advantage
 Tilt (sometimes used): slight advantage
 Lean: clear advantage
 Likely: strong, but not certain advantage
 Safe: outcome is nearly certain

<div style="overflow-x:auto;>
{| class="wikitable sortable" style="text-align:center"
|- valign=bottom
! District
! CPVI
! Incumbent
! Last result
! Cook
! IE
! Sabato
! Daily Kos
! RCP
! DDHQ
! 538 
! ED
! Winner
|-
! 
|  data-sort-value=9 | R+9
|  data-sort-value="Young Don" | Don Young (R)
|  data-sort-value=53.1 | 53.1% R
| 
| 
| 
| 
| 
| 
| 
| 
| data-sort-value=-1  | Don Young (R)
|-
! 
|  data-sort-value=2 | R+2
|  data-sort-value="O'Halleran Tom" | Tom O'Halleran (D)
|  data-sort-value=-53.8 | 53.8% D
| 
| 
| 
| 
| 
| 
| 
| 
| data-sort-value=-1  | Tom O'Halleran (D)
|-
! 
|  data-sort-value=1 | R+1
|  data-sort-value="Kirkpatrick Ann" | Ann Kirkpatrick (D)
|  data-sort-value=-54.7 | 54.7% D
| 
| 
| 
| 
| 
| 
| 
| 
| data-sort-value=-1  | Ann Kirkpatrick (D)
|-
! 
|  data-sort-value=9 | R+9
|  data-sort-value="Schweikert David" | David Schweikert (R)
|  data-sort-value=55.2 | 55.2% R
| 
| 
| 
| 
| 
| 
| 
| 
| data-sort-value=-1  | David Schweikert (R)
|-

! 
|  data-sort-value=7 | R+7
|  data-sort-value="Hill French" | French Hill (R)
|  data-sort-value=52.1 | 52.1% R
| 
| 
| 
| 
| 
| 
| 
| 
| data-sort-value=-1  | French Hill (R)
|-
! 
|  data-sort-value=11 | R+11
|  data-sort-value="LaMalfa Doug" | Doug LaMalfa (R)
|  data-sort-value=54.9 | 54.9% R
| 
| 
| 
| 
| 
| 
| 
| 
| data-sort-value=-1  | Doug LaMalfa (R)
|-
! 
|  data-sort-value=10 | R+10
|  data-sort-value="McClintock Tom" | Tom McClintock (R)
|  data-sort-value=54.1 | 54.1% R
| 
| 
| 
| 
| 
| 
| 
| 
| data-sort-value=-1  | Tom McClintock (R)

|-
! 
|  data-sort-value=-3 | D+3
|  data-sort-value="Bera Ami" | Ami Bera (D)
|  data-sort-value=-55.1 | 55.1% D
| 
| 
| 
| 
| 
| 
| 
| 
| data-sort-value=-1  | Ami Bera (D)

|-
! 
|  data-sort-value=9 | R+9
|  data-sort-value="Cook Paul" | Paul Cook (R)
|  data-sort-value=60 | 60.0% R
| 
| 
| 
| 
| 
| 
| 
| 
| data-sort-value=-1  | Jay Obernolte (R)
|-
! 
| data-sort-value=0 | EVEN
|  data-sort-value="Harder Josh" | Josh Harder (D)
|  data-sort-value=-52.3 | 52.3% D
| 
| 
| 
| 
| 
| 
| 
| 
| data-sort-value=-1  | Josh Harder (D)
|-
! 
|  data-sort-value=-5 | D+5
|  data-sort-value="Cox TJ" | TJ Cox (D)
|  data-sort-value=-50.4 | 50.4% D
| 
| 
| 
| 
| 
| 
| 
| 
| data-sort-value=-1  | David Valadao (R) 
|-
!
|  data-sort-value=8 | R+8
|  data-sort-value="Nunes Devin" | Devin Nunes (R)
|  data-sort-value=52.7 | 52.7% R
| 
| 
| 
| 
| 
| 
| 
| 
| data-sort-value=-1  | Devin Nunes (R)
|-
! 
| data-sort-value=0 | EVEN
|  data-sort-value="Garcia Mike" |  Mike Garcia (R)
|  data-sort-value= 54.9 | 54.9% R
| 
| 
| 
| 
| 
| 
| 
| 
| data-sort-value=-1  |  Mike Garcia (R) 
|-
! 
| data-sort-value=0 | EVEN
|  data-sort-value="Cisneros Gil" | Gil Cisneros (D)
|  data-sort-value=-51.6 | 51.6% D
| 
| 
| 
| 
| 
| 
| 
| 
| data-sort-value=-1  | Young Kim (R)
|-
! 
|  data-sort-value=9 | R+9
|  data-sort-value="Calvert Ken" | Ken Calvert (R)
|  data-sort-value=56.5 | 56.5% R
| 
| 
| 
| 
| 
| 
| 
| 
| data-sort-value=-1  | Ken Calvert (R)
|-
! 
|  data-sort-value=3 | R+3
|  data-sort-value="Porter Katie" | Katie Porter (D)
|  data-sort-value=-52.1 | 52.1% D
| 
| 
| 
| 
| 
| 
| 
| 
| data-sort-value=-1  | Katie Porter (D)
|-
! 
|  data-sort-value=4 | R+4
|  data-sort-value="Rouda Harley" | Harley Rouda (D)
|  data-sort-value=-53.6 | 53.6% D
| 
| 
| 
| 
| 
| 
| 
| 
| data-sort-value=-1  | Michelle Steel (R)
|-
! 
|  data-sort-value=11 | R+11
| Vacant
|  data-sort-value=51.7 | 51.7% R
| 
| 
| 
| 
| 
| 
| 
| 
| data-sort-value=-1  | Darrell Issa (R)
|-
! 
|  data-sort-value=6 | R+6
|  data-sort-value="Tipton Scott" | Scott Tipton (R)
|  data-sort-value=51.5 | 51.5% R
| 
| 
| 
| 
| 
| 
| 
| 
| data-sort-value=-1  | Lauren Boebert (R)
|-
! 
|  data-sort-value=-2 | D+2
|  data-sort-value="Crow Jason" | Jason Crow (D)
|  data-sort-value=-54.1 | 54.1% D
| 
| 
| 
| 
| 
| 
| 
| 
| data-sort-value=-1  | Jason Crow (D)
|-
! 
| data-sort-value=0 | EVEN
|  data-sort-value="Murphy Stephanie" | Stephanie Murphy (D)
|  data-sort-value=-57.7 | 57.7% D
| 
| 
| 
| 
| 
| 
| 
| 
| data-sort-value=-1  | Stephanie Murphy (D)
|-
! 
|  data-sort-value=-2 | D+2
|  data-sort-value="Crist Charlie" | Charlie Crist (D)
|  data-sort-value=-57.6 | 57.6% D
| 
| 
| 
| 
| 
| 
| 
| 
| data-sort-value=-1  | Charlie Crist (D)
|-
! 
|  data-sort-value=6 | R+6
|  data-sort-value="Spano Ross" | Ross Spano (R)
|  data-sort-value=53.0 | 53.0% R
| 
| 
| 
| 
| 
| 
| 
| 
| data-sort-value=-1  | Scott Franklin (R)
|-
! 
|  data-sort-value=7 | R+7
|  data-sort-value="Buchanan Vern" | Vern Buchanan (R)
|  data-sort-value=54.6 | 54.6% R
| 
| 
| 
| 
| 
| 
| 
| 
| data-sort-value=-1  | Vern Buchanan (R)
|-
! 
|  data-sort-value=5 | R+5
|  data-sort-value="Mast Brian" | Brian Mast (R)
|  data-sort-value=54.3 | 54.3% R
| 
| 
| 
| 
| 
| 
| 
| 
| data-sort-value=-1  | Brian Mast (R)
|-
! 
|  data-sort-value=-6 | D+6
|  data-sort-value="Mucarsel-Powell Debbie" | Debbie Mucarsel-Powell (D)
|  data-sort-value=-50.9 | 50.9% D
| 
| 
| 
| 
| 
| 
| 
| 
| data-sort-value=-1  | Carlos Giménez (R)
|-
! 
|  data-sort-value=-5 | D+5
|  data-sort-value="Shalala Donna" | Donna Shalala (D)
|  data-sort-value=-51.8 | 51.8% D
| 
| 
| 
| 
| 
| 
| 
| 
| data-sort-value=-1  | Maria Elvira Salazar (R)
|-
! 
|  data-sort-value=8 | R+8
|  data-sort-value="McBath Lucy" | Lucy McBath (D)
|  data-sort-value=-50.5 | 50.5% D
| 
| 
| 
| 
| 
| 
| 
| 
| data-sort-value=-1  | Lucy McBath (D)
|-
! 
|  data-sort-value=9 | R+9
|  data-sort-value="Woodall Rob" | Rob Woodall (R)
|  data-sort-value=50.1 | 50.1% R
| 
| 
| 
| 
| 
| 
| 
| 
| data-sort-value=-1  | Carolyn Bourdeaux (D)
|-
! 
|  data-sort-value=2 | R+2
|  data-sort-value="Casten Sean" | Sean Casten (D)
|  data-sort-value=-53.6 | 53.6% D
| 
| 
| 
| 
| 
| 
| 
| 
| data-sort-value=-1  | Sean Casten (D)
|-
! 
|  data-sort-value=3 | R+3
|  data-sort-value="Davis Rodney" | Rodney Davis (R)
|  data-sort-value=50.4 | 50.4% R
| 
| 
| 
| 
| 
| 
| 
| 
| data-sort-value=-1  | Rodney Davis (R)
|-
! 
|  data-sort-value=5 | R+5
|  data-sort-value="Underwood Lauren" | Lauren Underwood (D)
|  data-sort-value=-52.5 | 52.5% D
| 
| 
| 
| 
| 
| 
| 
| 
| data-sort-value=-1  | Lauren Underwood (D)
|-
! 
|  data-sort-value=-3 | D+3
|  data-sort-value="Bustos Cheri" | Cheri Bustos (D)
|  data-sort-value=-62.1 | 62.1% D
| 
| 
| 
| 
| 
| 
| 
| 
| data-sort-value=-1  | Cheri Bustos (D)
|-
! 
|  data-sort-value=9 | R+9
|  data-sort-value="Brooks Susan" | Susan Brooks (R)
|  data-sort-value=56.8 | 56.8% R
| 
| 
| 
| 
| 
| 
| 
| 
| data-sort-value=-1  | Victoria Spartz (R)
|-
! 
|  data-sort-value=-1 | D+1
|  data-sort-value="Finkenauer Abby" | Abby Finkenauer (D)
|  data-sort-value=-51.0 | 51.0% D
| 
| 
| 
| 
| 
| 
| 
| 
| data-sort-value=-1  | Ashley Hinson (R)
|-
! 
|  data-sort-value=-1 | D+1
|  data-sort-value="Loebsack Dave" | Dave Loebsack (D)
|  data-sort-value=-54.8 | 54.8% D
| 
| 
| 
| 
| 
| 
| 
| 
| data-sort-value=-1  | Mariannette Miller-Meeks (R) 
|-
! 
|  data-sort-value=1 | R+1
|  data-sort-value="Axne Cindy" | Cindy Axne (D)
|  data-sort-value=-49.3 | 49.3% D
| 
| 
| 
| 
| 
| 
| 
| 
| data-sort-value=-1  | Cindy Axne (D)
|-
! 
|  data-sort-value=11 | R+11
|  data-sort-value="King Steve" | Steve King (R)
|  data-sort-value=50.3 | 50.3% R
| 
| 
| 
| 
| 
| 
| 
| 
| data-sort-value=-1  | Randy Feenstra (R)
|-
! 
|  data-sort-value=10 | R+10
|  data-sort-value="Watkins Steve" | Steve Watkins (R)
|  data-sort-value=47.6 | 47.6% R
| 
| 
| 
| 
| 
| 
| 
| 
| data-sort-value=-1  | Jake LaTurner (R)
|-
! 
|  data-sort-value=4 | R+4
|  data-sort-value="Davids Sharice" | Sharice Davids (D)
|  data-sort-value=-53.6 | 53.6% D
| 
| 
| 
| 
| 
| 
| 
| 
| data-sort-value=-1  | Sharice Davids (D)
|-
! 
|  data-sort-value=9 | R+9
|  data-sort-value="Barr Andy" | Andy Barr (R)
|  data-sort-value=51.0 | 51.0% R
| 
| 
| 
| 
| 
| 
| 
| 
| data-sort-value=-1  | Andy Barr (R)
|-
! 
|  data-sort-value=2 | R+2
|  data-sort-value="Golden Jared" | Jared Golden (D)
|  data-sort-value=-50.5 | 50.5% D
| 
| 
| 
| 
| 
| 
| 
| 
| data-sort-value=-1  | Jared Golden (D)
|-
! 
|  data-sort-value=6 | R+6
|  data-sort-value="Amash Justin" | Justin Amash (L)
|  data-sort-value=54.4 | 54.4% R
| 
| 
| 
| 
| 
| 
| 
| 
| data-sort-value=-1  | Peter Meijer (R)
|-
! 
|  data-sort-value=4 | R+4
|  data-sort-value="Upton Fred" | Fred Upton (R)
|  data-sort-value=50.2 | 50.2% R
| 
| 
| 
| 
| 
| 
| 
| 
| data-sort-value=-1  | Fred Upton (R)
|-
! 
|  data-sort-value=7 | R+7
|  data-sort-value="Walberg Tim" | Tim Walberg (R)
|  data-sort-value=53.8 | 53.8% R
| 
| 
| 
| 
| 
| 
| 
| 
| data-sort-value=-1  | Tim Walberg (R)
|-
! 
|  data-sort-value=4 | R+4
|  data-sort-value="Slotkin Elissa" | Elissa Slotkin (D)
|  data-sort-value=-50.6 | 50.6% D
| 
| 
| 
| 
| 
| 
| 
| 
| data-sort-value=-1  | Elissa Slotkin (D)
|-
! 
|  data-sort-value=4 | R+4
|  data-sort-value="Stevens Haley" | Haley Stevens (D)
|  data-sort-value=-51.8 | 51.8% D
| 
| 
| 
| 
| 
| 
| 
| 
| data-sort-value=-1  | Haley Stevens (D)
|-
! 
|  data-sort-value=5 | R+5
|  data-sort-value="Hagedorn Jim" | Jim Hagedorn (R)
|  data-sort-value=50.1 | 50.1% R
| 
| 
| 
| 
| 
| 
| 
| 
| data-sort-value=-1  | Jim Hagedorn (R)
|-
! 
|  data-sort-value=2 | R+2
|  data-sort-value="Craig Angie" | Angie Craig (D)
|  data-sort-value=-52.7 | 52.7% D
| 
| 
| 
| 
| 
| 
| 
| 
| data-sort-value=-1  | Angie Craig (D)
|-
! 
|  data-sort-value=-1 | D+1
|  data-sort-value="Phillips Dean" | Dean Phillips (D)
|  data-sort-value=-55.7 | 55.7% D
| 
| 
| 
| 
| 
| 
| 
| 
| data-sort-value=-1  | Dean Phillips (D)
|-
! 
|  data-sort-value=-26 | D+26
|  data-sort-value="Omar Ilhan" | Ilhan Omar (D)
|  data-sort-value=-78.2 | 78.2% D
| 
| 
| 
| 
| 
| 
| 
| 
| data-sort-value=-1  | Ilhan Omar (D)
|-
! 
|  data-sort-value=12 | R+12
|  data-sort-value="Peterson Collin" | Collin Peterson (D)
|  data-sort-value=-52.1 | 52.1% D
| 
| 
| 
| 
| 
| 
| 
| 
| data-sort-value=-1  | Michelle Fischbach (R)
|-
! 
|  data-sort-value=4 | R+4
|  data-sort-value="Stauber Pete" | Pete Stauber (R)
|  data-sort-value=50.7 | 50.7% R
| 
| 
| 
| 
| 
| 
| 
| 
| data-sort-value=-1  | Pete Stauber (R)
|-
! 
|  data-sort-value=8 | R+8
|  data-sort-value="Wagner Ann" | Ann Wagner (R)
|  data-sort-value=51.2 | 51.2% R
| 
| 
| 
| 
| 
| 
| 
| 
| data-sort-value=-1  | Ann Wagner (R)
|-
! 
|  data-sort-value=11 | R+11
|  data-sort-value="Gianforte Greg" | Greg Gianforte (R)
|  data-sort-value=50.9 | 50.9% R
| 
| 
| 
| 
| 
| 
| 
| 
| data-sort-value=-1  | Matt Rosendale (R)
|-
! 
|  data-sort-value=4 | R+4
|  data-sort-value="Bacon Don" | Don Bacon (R)
|  data-sort-value=51.0 | 51.0% R
| 
| 
| 
| 
| 
| 
| 
| 
| data-sort-value=-1  | Don Bacon (R)
|-
! 
|  data-sort-value=2 | R+2
|  data-sort-value="Lee Susie" | Susie Lee (D)
|  data-sort-value=-51.9 | 51.9% D
| 
| 
| 
| 
| 
| 
| 
| 
| data-sort-value=-1  | Susie Lee (D)
|-
! 
|  data-sort-value=-3 | D+3
|  data-sort-value="Horsford Steven" | Steven Horsford (D)
|  data-sort-value=-51.9 | 51.9% D
| 
| 
| 
| 
| 
| 
| 
| 
| data-sort-value=-1  | Steven Horsford (D)
|-
! 
|  data-sort-value=2 | R+2
|  data-sort-value="Pappas Chris" | Chris Pappas (D)
|  data-sort-value=-53.6 | 53.6% D
| 
| 
| 
| 
| 
| 
| 
| 
| data-sort-value=-1  | Chris Pappas (D)
|-
! 
|  data-sort-value=-2 | D+2
|  data-sort-value="Kuster Ann" | Ann McLane Kuster (D)
|  data-sort-value=-55.5 | 55.5% D
| 
| 
| 
| 
| 
| 
| 
| 
| data-sort-value=-1  | Ann McLane Kuster (D)
|-
! 
|  data-sort-value=1 | R+1
|  data-sort-value="Van Drew Jeff Van" | Jeff Van Drew (R)
|  data-sort-value=-52.9 | 52.9% D
| 
| 
| 
| 
| 
| 
| 
| 
| data-sort-value=-1  | Jeff Van Drew (R)
|-
! 
|  data-sort-value=2 | R+2
|  data-sort-value="Kim Andy" | Andy Kim (D)
|  data-sort-value=-50.0 | 50.0% D
| 
| 
| 
| 
| 
| 
| 
| 
| data-sort-value=-1  | Andy Kim (D)
|-
! 
|  data-sort-value=3 | R+3
|  data-sort-value="Gottheimer Josh" | Josh Gottheimer (D)
|  data-sort-value=-56.2 | 56.2% D
| 
| 
| 
| 
| 
| 
| 
| 
| data-sort-value=-1  | Josh Gottheimer (D)
|-
! 
|  data-sort-value=3 | R+3
|  data-sort-value="Malinowski Tom" | Tom Malinowski (D)
|  data-sort-value=-51.7% | 51.7% D
| 
| 
| 
| 
| 
| 
| 
| 
| data-sort-value=-1  | Tom Malinowski (D)
|-
! 
|  data-sort-value=3 | R+3
|  data-sort-value="Sherrill Mikie" | Mikie Sherrill (D)
|  data-sort-value=-56.8 | 56.8% D
| 
| 
| 
| 
| 
| 
| 
| 
| data-sort-value=-1  | Mikie Sherrill (D)
|-
! 
|  data-sort-value=6 | R+6
|  data-sort-value="Torres Small Xochitl Torres" | Xochitl Torres Small (D)
|  data-sort-value=-50.9 | 50.9% D
| 
| 
| 
| 
| 
| 
| 
| 
| data-sort-value=-1  | Yvette Herrell (R)
|-
! 
|  data-sort-value=5 | R+5
|  data-sort-value="Zeldin Lee" | Lee Zeldin (R)
|  data-sort-value=51.5 | 51.5% R
| 
| 
| 
| 
| 
| 
| 
| 
| data-sort-value=-1  | Lee Zeldin (R) 
|-
! 
|  data-sort-value=3 | R+3
|  data-sort-value="King Peter T." | Peter T. King (R) 
|  data-sort-value=53.1 | 53.1% R
| 
| 
| 
| 
| 
| 
| 
| 
| data-sort-value=-1  | Andrew Garbarino (R)  
|-
! 
|  data-sort-value=3 | R+3
|  data-sort-value="Rose Max" | Max Rose (D)
|  data-sort-value=-53.0 | 53.0% D
| 
| 
| 
| 
| 
| 
| 
| 
| data-sort-value=-1  | Nicole Malliotakis (R)
|-
! 
|  data-sort-value=1 | R+1
|  data-sort-value="Patrick Maloney Sean Patrick" | Sean Patrick Maloney (D)
|  data-sort-value=-55.5 | 55.5% D
| 
| 
| 
| 
| 
| 
| 
| 
| data-sort-value=-1  | Sean Patrick Maloney (D)
|-
! 
|  data-sort-value=2 | R+2
|  data-sort-value="Delgado Antonio" | Antonio Delgado (D)
|  data-sort-value=-51.4 | 51.4% D
| 
| 
| 
| 
| 
| 
| 
| 
| data-sort-value=-1  | Antonio Delgado (D)
|-
! 
|  data-sort-value=4 | R+4
|  data-sort-value="Stefanik Elise" | Elise Stefanik (R)
|  data-sort-value=56.1 | 56.1% R
| 
| 
| 
| 
| 
| 
| 
| 
| data-sort-value=-1  | Elise Stefanik (R)
|-
! 
|  data-sort-value=6 | R+6
|  data-sort-value="Brindisi Anthony" | Anthony Brindisi (D)
|  data-sort-value=-50.8 | 50.8% D
| 
| 
| 
| 
| 
| 
| 
| 
| data-sort-value=-1  | Claudia Tenney (R) 
|-
! 
|  data-sort-value=-3 | D+3
|  data-sort-value="Katko John" | John Katko (R)
|  data-sort-value=52.6 | 52.6% R
| 
| 
| 
| 
| 
| 
| 
| 
| data-sort-value=-1  | John Katko (R) 
|-
! 
|  data-sort-value=11 | R+11
|  data-sort-value="Jacobs Chris" | Chris Jacobs (R)
|  data-sort-value="51.8" | 51.8% R
| 
| 
| 
| 
| 
| 
| 
| 
| data-sort-value=-1  | Chris Jacobs (R)
|-
! 
|  data-sort-value=-17 | D+17
|  data-sort-value="Butterfield G. K." | G. K. Butterfield (D)
|  data-sort-value=-69.8 | 69.8% D
| 
| 
| 
| 
| 
| 
| 
| 
| data-sort-value=-1  | G.K. Butterfield (D)
|-
! 
|  data-sort-value=-9 | D+9
|  data-sort-value="Holding George" | George Holding (R)
|  data-sort-value=51.3 | 51.3% R
|
|
|
|
|
|
|
|
| data-sort-value=-1  | Deborah Ross (D)
|-
! 
|  data-sort-value=-8 | D+8
|  data-sort-value="Walker Mark" | Mark Walker (R)
|  data-sort-value=56.5 | 56.5% R
| 
| 
| 
| 
| 
| 
| 
| 
| data-sort-value=-1  | Kathy Manning (D)
|-
! 
|  data-sort-value=5 | R+5
|  data-sort-value="Hudson Richard" | Richard Hudson (R)
|  data-sort-value=55.3 | 55.3% R
| 
| 
| 
| 
| 
| 
| 
| 
| data-sort-value=-1  | Richard Hudson (R)
|-
! 
|  data-sort-value=7 | R+7
|  data-sort-value="Bishop Dan" | Dan Bishop (R)
|  data-sort-value=50.7 | 50.7% R
| 
| 
| 
| 
| 
| 
| 
| 
| data-sort-value=-1  | Dan Bishop (R)
|-
! 
|  data-sort-value=14 | R+14
| Vacant
|  data-sort-value=59.2 | 59.2% R
| 
| 
| 
| 
| 
| 
| 
| 
| data-sort-value=-1  | Madison Cawthorn (R)
|-
! 
|  data-sort-value=5 | R+5
|  data-sort-value="Chabot Steve" | Steve Chabot (R)
|  data-sort-value=51.3 | 51.3% R
| 
| 
| 
| 
| 
| 
| 
| 
| data-sort-value=-1  | Steve Chabot (R)
|-
! 
|  data-sort-value=4 | R+4
|  data-sort-value="Turner Mike" | Mike Turner (R)
|  data-sort-value=55.9 | 55.9% R
| 
| 
| 
| 
| 
| 
| 
| 
| data-sort-value=-1  | Mike Turner (R)
|-
! 
|  data-sort-value=7 | R+7
|  data-sort-value="Balderson Troy" | Troy Balderson (R)
|  data-sort-value=51.4 | 51.4% R
| 
| 
| 
| 
| 
| 
| 
| 
| data-sort-value=-1  | Troy Balderson (R)
|-
! 
|  data-sort-value=-7 | D+7
|  data-sort-value="Ryan Tim" | Tim Ryan (D)
|  data-sort-value=-61.0 | 61.0% D
| 
| 
| 
| 
| 
| 
| 
| 
| data-sort-value=-1  | Tim Ryan (D)
|-
! 
|  data-sort-value=10 | R+10
|  data-sort-value="Horn Kendra" | Kendra Horn (D)
|  data-sort-value=-50.7 | 50.7% D
| 
| 
| 
| 
| 
| 
| 
| 
| data-sort-value=-1  | Stephanie Bice (R)
|-
! 
| data-sort-value=0 | EVEN
|  data-sort-value="DeFazio Peter" | Peter DeFazio (D)
|  data-sort-value=-56.0 | 56.0% D
| 
| 
| 
| 
| 
| 
| 
| 
| data-sort-value=-1  | Peter DeFazio (D)
|-
! 
|  data-sort-value=1 | R+1
|  data-sort-value="Fitzpatrick Brian" | Brian Fitzpatrick (R)
|  data-sort-value=51.3 | 51.3% R
| 
| 
| 
| 
| 
| 
| 
| 
| data-sort-value=-1  | Brian Fitzpatrick (R)
|-
! 
|  data-sort-value=-1 | D+1
|  data-sort-value="Wild Susan" | Susan Wild (D)
|  data-sort-value=-53.5 | 53.5% D
| 
| 
| 
| 
| 
| 
| 
| 
| data-sort-value=-1  | Susan Wild (D)
|-
! 
|  data-sort-value=1 | R+1
|  data-sort-value="Cartwright Matt" | Matt Cartwright (D)
|  data-sort-value=-54.6 | 54.6% D
| 
| 
| 
| 
| 
| 
| 
| 
| data-sort-value=-1  | Matt Cartwright (D)
|-
! 
|  data-sort-value=6 | R+6
|  data-sort-value="Perry Scott" | Scott Perry (R)
|  data-sort-value=51.3 | 51.3% R
| 
| 
| 
| 
| 
| 
| 
| 
| data-sort-value=-1  | Scott Perry (R)
|-
! 
|  data-sort-value=8 | R+8
|  data-sort-value="Kelly Mike" | Mike Kelly (R)
|  data-sort-value=51.6 | 51.6% R
| 
| 
| 
| 
| 
| 
| 
| 
| data-sort-value=-1  | Mike Kelly (R)
|-
! 
|  data-sort-value=3 | R+3
|  data-sort-value="Lamb Conor" | Conor Lamb (D)
|  data-sort-value=-56.3 | 56.3% D
| 
| 
| 
| 
| 
| 
| 
| 
| data-sort-value=-1  | Conor Lamb (D)
|-
! 
|  data-sort-value=10 | R+10
|  data-sort-value="Cunningham Joe" | Joe Cunningham (D)
|  data-sort-value=-50.6% | 50.6% D
| 
| 
| 
| 
| 
| 
| 
| 
| data-sort-value=-1  | Nancy Mace (R)
|-
! 
|  data-sort-value=12 | R+12
|  data-sort-value="Wilson Joe" | Joe Wilson (R)
|  data-sort-value=56.3% | 56.3% R
| 
| 
| 
| 
| 
| 
| 
| 
| data-sort-value=-1  | Joe Wilson (R)
|-
! 
|  data-sort-value=25 | R+25
|  data-sort-value="Gohmert Louie" | Louie Gohmert (R)
|  data-sort-value=72.3 | 72.3% R
| 
| 
| 
| 
| 
| 
| 
| 
| data-sort-value=-1  | Louie Gohmert (R)
|-
! 
|  data-sort-value=11 | R+11
|  data-sort-value="Crenshaw Dan" | Dan Crenshaw (R)
|  data-sort-value=52.8 | 52.8% R
| 
| 
| 
| 
| 
| 
| 
| 
| data-sort-value=-1  | Dan Crenshaw (R)
|-
! 
|  data-sort-value=13 | R+13
|  data-sort-value="Taylor Van" | Van Taylor (R)
|  data-sort-value=54.3 | 54.3% R
| 
| 
| 
| 
| 
| 
| 
| 
| data-sort-value=-1  | Van Taylor (R)
|-
! 
|  data-sort-value=9 | R+9
|  data-sort-value="Wright Ron" | Ron Wright (R)
|  data-sort-value=53.1 | 53.1% R
| 
| 
| 
| 
| 
| 
| 
| 
| data-sort-value=-1  | Ron Wright (R)
|-
! 
|  data-sort-value=7 | R+7
|  data-sort-value="Fletcher Lizzie" | Lizzie Fletcher (D)
|  data-sort-value=-52.5 | 52.5% D
| 
| 
| 
| 
| 
| 
| 
| 
| data-sort-value=-1  | Lizzie Fletcher (D)
|-
! 
|  data-sort-value=9 | R+9
|  data-sort-value="McCaul Michael" | Michael McCaul (R)
|  data-sort-value=51.1 | 51.1% R
| 
| 
| 
| 
| 
| 
| 
| 
| data-sort-value=-1  | Michael McCaul (R)
|-
! 
|  data-sort-value=10 | R+10
|  data-sort-value="Roy Chip" | Chip Roy (R)
|  data-sort-value=50.2 | 50.2% R
| 
| 
| 
| 
| 
| 
| 
| 
| data-sort-value=-1  | Chip Roy (R)
|-
! 
|  data-sort-value=10 | R+10
|  data-sort-value="Olson Pete" | Pete Olson (R)
|  data-sort-value=51.4 | 51.4% R
| 
| 
| 
| 
| 
| 
| 
| 
| data-sort-value=-1  | Troy Nehls (R)
|-
! 
|  data-sort-value=1 | R+1
|  data-sort-value="Hurd Will" | Will Hurd (R)
|  data-sort-value=49.2 | 49.2% R
| 
| 
| 
| 
| 
| 
| 
| 
| data-sort-value=-1  | Tony Gonzales (R)
|-
! 
|  data-sort-value=9 | R+9
|  data-sort-value="Marchant Kenny" | Kenny Marchant (R)
|  data-sort-value=50.6 | 50.6% R
| 
| 
| 
| 
| 
| 
| 
| 
| data-sort-value=-1  | Beth Van Duyne (R)
|-
! 
|  data-sort-value=11 | R+11
|  data-sort-value="Williams Roger" | Roger Williams (R)
|  data-sort-value=53.5 | 53.5% R
| 
| 
| 
| 
| 
| 
| 
| 
| data-sort-value=-1  | Roger Williams (R)
|-
! 
|  data-sort-value=13 | R+13
|  data-sort-value="Cloud Michael" | Michael Cloud (R)
|  data-sort-value=60.3 | 60.3% R
| 
| 
| 
| 
| 
| 
| 
| 
| data-sort-value=-1  | Michael Cloud (R)
|-
! 
|  data-sort-value=10 | R+10
|  data-sort-value="Carter John" | John Carter (R)
|  data-sort-value=50.6 | 50.6% R
| 
| 
| 
| 
| 
| 
| 
| 
| data-sort-value=-1  | John Carter (R)
|-
! 
|  data-sort-value=5 | R+5
|  data-sort-value="Allred Colin" | Colin Allred (D)
|  data-sort-value=-52.3 | 52.3% D
| 
| 
| 
| 
| 
| 
| 
| 
| data-sort-value=-1  | Colin Allred (D)
|-
! 
|  data-sort-value=13 | R+13
|  data-sort-value="McAdams Ben" | Ben McAdams (D)
|  data-sort-value=-50.1 | 50.1% D
| 
| 
| 
| 
| 
| 
| 
| 
| data-sort-value=-1  | Burgess Owens (R)
|-
! 
|  data-sort-value=8 | R+8
|  data-sort-value="Wittman Rob" | Rob Wittman (R)
|  data-sort-value=55.2 | 55.2% R
| 
| 
| 
| 
| 
| 
| 
| 
| data-sort-value=-1  | Rob Wittman (R)
|-
! 
|  data-sort-value=3 | R+3
|  data-sort-value="Luria Elaine" | Elaine Luria (D)
|  data-sort-value=-51.1 | 51.1% D
| 
| 
| 
| 
| 
| 
| 
| 
| data-sort-value=-1  | Elaine Luria (D)
|-
! 
|  data-sort-value=6 | R+6
|  data-sort-value="Riggleman Denver" | Denver Riggleman (R)
|  data-sort-value=53.2 | 53.2% R
| 
| 
| 
| 
| 
| 
| 
| 
| data-sort-value=-1  | Bob Good (R)
|-
! 
|  data-sort-value=6 | R+6
|  data-sort-value="Spanberger Abigail" | Abigail Spanberger (D)
|  data-sort-value=-50.3 | 50.3% D
| 
| 
| 
| 
| 
| 
| 
| 
| data-sort-value=-1  | Abigail Spanberger (D)
|-
! 
|  data-sort-value=-1 | D+1
|  data-sort-value="Wexton Jennifer" | Jennifer Wexton (D)
|  data-sort-value=-56.2 | 56.2% D
| 
| 
| 
| 
| 
| 
| 
| 
| data-sort-value=-1  | Jennifer Wexton (D)
|-
! 
|  data-sort-value=4 | R+4
|  data-sort-value="Herrera Beutler Jaime" | Jaime Herrera Beutler (R)
|  data-sort-value=52.7 | 52.7% R
| 
| 
| 
| 
| 
| 
| 
| 
| data-sort-value=-1  | Jaime Herrera Beutler (R)
|-
! 
| data-sort-value=0 | EVEN
|  data-sort-value="Schrier Kim" | Kim Schrier (D)
|  data-sort-value=-52.4 | 52.4% D
| 
| 
| 
| 
| 
| 
| 
| 
| data-sort-value=-1  | Kim Schrier (D)
|-
! 
| data-sort-value=0 | EVEN
|  data-sort-value="Kind Ron" | Ron Kind (D)
|  data-sort-value=-59.7 | 59.7% D
| 
| 
| 
| 
| 
| 
| 
| 
| data-sort-value=-1  | Ron Kind (D)
|-

! colspan=4 | Overall
|  | D - 229R - 17927 tossups
|  | D - 239R - 18115 tossups
|  | D - 243R - 192
|  | D - 228R - 18126 tossups
|  | D - 209R - 18244 tossups
|  | D - 230R - 18223 tossups
|  | D - 230R - 18916 tossups
|  | D - 242R - 193
|  | D - 222  13  R - 213  14  L - 0  1 
|- valign=top
! District
! 2017 CPVI
! Incumbent
! Previous result
! Cook
! IE
! Sabato
! Daily Kos
! RCP
! DDHQ
! 538
! ED
! Winner

Generic ballot polls 

The following is a list of generic party ballot polls conducted in advance of the 2020 House of Representatives elections.

Party listings 
The campaign committees for the two parties -- the DCCC and NRCC -- publish their own lists of targeted seats.

Democratic 
These races were added to the DCCC's "battlefield" list in January 2020.
 AK-AL -- Don Young
 CA-25 --  Mike Garcia
 KS-02 -- Steven Watkins
 NC-08 -- Richard Hudson
 NJ-02 -- Jeff Van Drew
 TX-02 -- Dan Crenshaw

These races were added to the DCCC's "battlefield" list in August 2019.
 FL-16 -- Vern Buchanan
 IA-02 -- Dave Loebsack (D)
 MI-03 -- Justin Amash (L)
 MT-AL -- Greg Gianforte
 OH-12 -- Troy Balderson
 VA-05 -- Denver Riggleman

These races were added to the DCCC's "battlefield" list in January 2019.

 AZ-06 -- David Schweikert
 CA-22 -- Devin Nunes
 CA-50 -- Duncan Hunter
 CO-03 -- Scott Tipton
 FL-15 -- Ross Spano
 FL-18 -- Brian Mast
 GA-07 -- Rob Woodall
 IA-04 -- Steve King
 IL-13 -- Rodney Davis
 IN-05 -- Susan Brooks
 KY-06 -- Andy Barr
 MI-06 -- Fred Upton
 MN-01 -- Jim Hagedorn
 MO-02 -- Ann Wagner
 NC-02 -- George Holding
 NC-09 -- Dan Bishop
 NC-13 -- Ted Budd
 NE-02 -- Don Bacon
 NY-01 -- Lee Zeldin
 NY-02 -- Peter King
 NY-24 -- John Katko
 NY-27 -- Chris Collins
 OH-01 -- Steve Chabot
 PA-01 -- Brian Fitzpatrick
 PA-10 -- Scott Perry
 PA-16 -- Mike Kelly
 TX-10 -- Michael McCaul
 TX-21 -- Chip Roy
 TX-22 -- Pete Olson
 TX-23 -- Will Hurd
 TX-24 -- Kenny Marchant
 TX-31 -- John Carter
 WA-03 -- Jaime Herrera Beutler

These races were added to the DCCC's "frontline" list of defensive targets in February 2019.

 AZ-01 -- Tom O'Halleran
 CA-10 -- Josh Harder
 CA-21 -- TJ Cox
 CA-39 -- Gil Cisneros
 CA-45 -- Katie Porter
 CA-48 -- Harley Rouda
 CA-49 -- Mike Levin
 CO-06 -- Jason Crow
 CT-05 -- Jahana Hayes
 FL-26 -- Debbie Mucarsel-Powell
 GA-06 -- Lucy McBath
 IA-01 -- Abby Finkenauer
 IA-03 -- Cindy Axne
 IL-06 -- Sean Casten
 IL-14 -- Lauren Underwood
 KS-03 -- Sharice Davids
 ME-02 -- Jared Golden
 MI-08 -- Elissa Slotkin
 MI-11 -- Haley Stevens
 MN-02 -- Angie Craig
 NH-01 -- Chris Pappas
 NJ-03 -- Andy Kim
 NJ-05 -- Josh Gottheimer
 NJ-07 -- Tom Malinowski
 NJ-11 -- Mikie Sherrill
 NM-02 -- Xochitl Torres Small
 NV-03 -- Susie Lee
 NV-04 -- Steven Horsford
 NY-11 -- Max Rose
 NY-19 -- Antonio Delgado
 NY-22 -- Anthony Brindisi
 OK-05 -- Kendra Horn
 PA-07 -- Susan Wild
 PA-08 -- Matt Cartwright
 PA-17 -- Conor Lamb
 SC-01 -- Joe Cunningham
 TX-07 -- Lizzie Fletcher
 TX-32 -- Colin Allred
 UT-04 -- Ben McAdams
 VA-02 -- Elaine Luria
 VA-07 -- Abigail Spanberger
 WA-08 -- Kim Schrier

Republican 
These races were announced as the NRCC's offensive targets in February 2019.

 AZ-01 -- Tom O'Halleran
 AZ-02 -- Ann Kirkpatrick
 CA-10 -- Josh Harder
 CA-21 -- TJ Cox
 CA-25 -- Katie Hill
 CA-39 -- Gil Cisneros
 CA-45 -- Katie Porter
 CA-48 -- Harley Rouda
 CA-49 -- Mike Levin
 CO-06 -- Jason Crow
 FL-07 -- Stephanie Murphy
 FL-13 -- Charlie Crist
 FL-26 -- Debbie Mucarsel-Powell
 FL-27 -- Donna Shalala
 GA-06 -- Lucy McBath
 IA-01 -- Abby Finkenauer
 IA-02 -- Dave Loebsack
 IA-03 -- Cindy Axne
 IL-06 -- Sean Casten
 IL-14 -- Lauren Underwood
 IL-17 -- Cheri Bustos
 KS-03 -- Sharice Davids
 ME-02 -- Jared Golden
 MI-08 -- Elissa Slotkin
 MI-11 -- Haley Stevens
 MN-02 -- Angie Craig
 MN-03 -- Dean Phillips
 MN-07 -- Collin Peterson
 NH-01 -- Chris Pappas
 NJ-03 -- Andy Kim
 NJ-05 -- Josh Gottheimer
 NJ-07 -- Tom Malinowski
 NJ-11 -- Mikie Sherrill
 NM-02 -- Xochitl Torres Small
 NV-03 -- Susie Lee
 NV-04 -- Steven Horsford
 NY-11 -- Max Rose
 NY-18 -- Sean Patrick Maloney
 NY-19 -- Antonio Delgado
 NY-22 -- Anthony Brindisi
 OK-05 -- Kendra Horn
 OR-04 -- Peter DeFazio
 PA-07 -- Susan Wild
 PA-08 -- Matt Cartwright
 PA-17 -- Conor Lamb
 SC-01 -- Joe Cunningham
 TX-07 -- Lizzie Fletcher
 TX-32 -- Colin Allred
 UT-04 -- Ben McAdams
 VA-02 -- Elaine Luria
 VA-07 -- Abigail Spanberger
 VA-10 -- Jennifer Wexton
 WA-08 -- Kim Schrier
 WI-03 -- Ron Kind

Notes

References 

House